Rhine Valley (German: Rheintal) is the valley, or any section of it, of the river Rhine in Europe.

Particular valleys of the Rhine or any of its sections:

 Alpine Rhine Valley

 High Rhine Valley
 Upper Rhine Valley (or Upper Rhine Plain, also known as Rhine Rift Valley), a rift valley between Basel and Bingen am Rhein, Germany
 Middle Rhine Valley
 Lower Rhine Valley

See also 
 Oberrheintal (translation: "Upper Rhine Valley", but not to be confused with the Upper Rhine Valley), a former district in the Canton of St. Gallen, Switzerland, part of the St. Gallen Rhine Valley
 Unterrheintal (translation: "Lower Rhine Valley"), a former district in the Canton of St. Gallen, Switzerland, part of the St. Gallen Rhine Valley

Notes